This is a list of insurance companies in Uganda regulated by the Insurance Regulatory Authority of Uganda:

Non-life insurance companies
 basani insurance limited
 Alliance Africa General Insurance Limited
 Britam Insurance Uganda Limited 
 CIC General Insurance Uganda Limited
 East African Underwriters Limited
 GoldStar Life Assurance Company Limited
 NIC General Insurance Company Limited
 Statewide Insurance Company Limited
 The Jubilee Insurance Company of Uganda
 TransAfrica Assurance Limited
 UAP Insurance Uganda Limited

Life insurance companies
 Prudential Assurance Uganda Limited (Acquired Goldstar Insurance in June 2015)
 The Jubilee Life Insurance Company of Uganda
 Liberty Life Assurance Company Limited 
 NIC Life Assurance Company Limited
 Sanlam Life Insurance Company Limited 
 UAP Life Assurance Uganda Limited
 CIC Africa Life Assurance Limited

See also
 Banking in Uganda
 Insurance Regulatory Authority of Uganda
 List of companies based in Uganda

References

External links
 Uganda Investment Authority

Financial services companies of Uganda
Insurance Companies